Săpunari may refer to several villages in Romania:

 Săpunari, a village in Morărești Commune, Argeș County
 Săpunari, a village in Lehliu Commune, Călărași County